The Writers Guild of America Award for Best Original Screenplay is one of the three film writing awards given by the Writers Guild of America.

Woody Allen holds the record for most wins and nominations for the award, with five wins out of twenty nominations.

Winners and nominees

Notes
 "†" indicates a film that won the Academy Award for Best Original Screenplay
"±±±" indicates a place on the 101 Greatest Screenplays list

1960s

1970s

1980s

1990s

2000s

2010s

2020s

Writers with multiple awards
5 Awards
Woody Allen

2 Awards
Warren Beatty
Mark Boal
Paddy Chayefsky 
Larry Gelbart
Robert Towne

Writers with multiple nominations

20 Nominations
Woody Allen

5 Nominations
Ethan Coen
Joel Coen
Paul Mazursky

4 Nominations
Paul Thomas Anderson
Wes Anderson
Robert Benton
Lawrence Kasdan
Thomas McCarthy

3 Nominations
Warren Beatty
Marshall Brickman
Francis Ford Coppola
Blake Edwards
Nora Ephron
Barry Levinson
Kenneth Lonergan
George Lucas
John Sayles
Neil Simon
Aaron Sorkin

2 Nominations
Judd Apatow
Noah Baumbach
Mark Boal
James L. Brooks
James Cameron
Paddy Chayefsky
Damien Chazelle
Diablo Cody
Roman Coppola
Cameron Crowe
Larry Gelbart
Hugo Guinness
Rian Johnson
Neil Jordan
Charlie Kaufman
Adam McKay
Gary Ross
David O. Russell
Taylor Sheridan
Oliver Stone
Robert Towne

See also
 Academy Award for Best Original Screenplay
 BAFTA Award for Best Original Screenplay
 Critics' Choice Movie Award for Best Screenplay

References

External links 
 

Screenplay, Original
Screenwriting awards for film